Chemistry of Consciousness is the fifth studio album by American thrash metal band Toxic Holocaust, released on October 25, 2013.

Track listing

Personnel
Toxic Holocaust
 Joel Grind - guitars, lead vocals
 Phil Zeller - bass, backing vocals
 Nick Bellmore - drums

Production
 Kurt Ballou - mixing
 Brad Boatright - mastering

References

External links

2013 albums
Toxic Holocaust albums
Relapse Records albums
Albums produced by Kurt Ballou